Vadym Anatoliyovych Kopylov is Ukrainian statesman.

He has served as deputy chairman of State Tax Service of Ukraine, deputy minister of Coal Industry, Finance, first deputy minister of Fuel and Energy, Finance, Economic Development and Trade of Ukraine. Chairman of the Board of «Naftogaz Ukraine» in 2000–2002 years.

Biography

Early years. Education 

Vadym Kopylov was born September 19, 1958 in Stakhanov (Lugansk oblast, Ukrainian SSR). In 1980 he graduated from the Moscow State Mining University (specialty «Mining engineer and economist»).

Career 

1980–1984: mining master, district mining setter, chairman of Labor and Wages Department in Mine named XXII Congress of the CPSU of production association «Stahanovvuhillya»
1984–1989: chief economist, Mine named Kirov of production association «Stahanovvuhillya»
1989–1994: chairman of Planning and Economic Department, deputy general director - director of economics of production association «Luganskvuhillya»
1994–1996: deputy minister of Coal Industry
1996 - deputy general director of the production association «Luganskvuhillya»
1996–1998: chairman of General Department of enforcement of tax payments (State Tax Administration of Ukraine)
1998–2000: deputy chairman of the State Tax Administration of Ukraine
July 14, 2000 – February 5, 2002: first deputy minister of Fuel and Energy - chairman of the Board of «Naftogaz Ukraine»
2002–2003: deputy chairman of the State Tax Administration of Ukraine (again)
2003–2003: deputy state secretary (Ministry of Finance of Ukraine)
2003–2004: deputy minister of Finance
2004–2005: deputy chairman of the State Tax Administration of Ukraine (3d time)
2005–2006: chairman of the Supervisory Board of «Universal commercial bank «Cambio»
2006–2007: 1st deputy minister of Finance
March 11, 2010 – December 28, 2010: 1st deputy minister of Finance (again)
December 28, 2010 – 30 March 2012: 1st deputy minister of Economic Development and Trade
February 14, 2012 – March 23, 2012: acting minister of Economic Development and Trade of Ukraine

External links 
Biography on the website of the Ministry of Finance of Ukraine
Biography in «LIGA.Dossier»

1958 births
Living people
People from Stakhanov, Ukraine
Government ministers of Ukraine
Ministry of Economic Development, Trade and Agriculture
Naftogaz people
Ukrainian chief executives
Ukrainian businesspeople in the oil industry
Moscow State Mining University alumni